Tokusou Sentai Dekaranger is a Japanese television series and the 28th entry in the Super Sentai series. In an iteration of the planet Earth where extraterrestrial contact is made possible, the S.P.D. (Special Police Dekaranger) battles alien criminals collectively called "Alienizers".

Main characters

Dekarangers

In battle, they wield varying . After undergoing further training, the primary Dekarangers gain the ability to transform into their S.W.A.T. Modes, which grants the use of the high-powered  beam machine gun.

Ban
While he joins the newly created Fire Squad as an elite officer in the series finale, he occasionally returns to help his original team. Initially starting with an immature personality, he slowly matures throughout the series.

In battle, Ban is a practitioner of the fictional space martial art , which blends his martial arts skills with gunplay. While wielding Doggie Kruger's D-Sword Vega, Ban can perform the  attack and the  attack.

As of the direct-to-video anniversary special Tokusou Sentai Dekaranger: 10 Years After, Ban has acquired a red-colored S.W.A.T. Mode vest to signify his membership in the Fire Squad.

Hoji
While he is reserved about his personal life and shows little emotion to prevent both from interfering with his work, he has a tendency to blurt out English phrases such as "Perfect!", "Unbelievable!", and "Super cool!", among other unorthodox sayings. Due to their personalities, Hoji also clashes with Ban throughout the series, though the former slowly warms up to him and eventually returns his friendship. Later in the series, he applies for a gold badge promotion from the Tokkyou division, but ultimately refuses despite passing due to a personal tragedy. In the direct-to-video anniversary special Tokusou Sentai Dekaranger: 10 Years After, Hoji goes undercover as a shut-in after Kruger's seeming turn to crime to help Ban and Sen-chan restore their leader's reputation.

He can also combine his D-Arms to form the  rifle.

Sen-chan
The oldest of seven siblings from a poor family, he displays nycto- and claustrophobia after accidentally falling into a well when he was a child, but was subsequently rescued by a policeman, which inspired him to take up police work. Despite his usually calm demeanor however, he is said to be scary when angered. He also displays a crush on teammate Umeko, but avoids sharing it publicly. As of the crossover film Mahō Sentai Magiranger vs. Dekaranger and succeeding Super Sentai series Uchu Sentai Kyuranger, they have moved in together and became engaged respectively.

In battle, Sen-chan also wields a D-Knuckle and D-Rod, the latter of which he can use to perform the  attack.

Jasmine
In the past, she suffered from depression over her then-inability to control her abilities and contemplated suicide by allowing an Alienizer to kill her. However, she was rescued and recruited by Doggie Kruger. As of the direct-to-video anniversary special Tokusou Sentai Dekaranger: 10 Years After, Jasmine got married and had a son named .

Her ESPer abilities allow her to pick up on sensory impressions of others by handling an object connected to them or visiting a location her target has touched or been to, though overuse of her powers exhausts her. To control her powers, she wears gloves. Furthermore, as a result of breast-feeding her son during Dekaranger: 10 Years After, Jasmine gains the ability to teleport herself to any part of the universe. In the crossover film Mahou Sentai Magiranger vs. Dekaranger, Jasmine displays the ability to break the fourth wall. In battle, she can use her SP License to perform the  attack and wields a D-Knuckle and the jitte-like  baton, which comes equipped with coin-like  and can combine with her D-Knuckle to form the  pistol. Together with Umeko and their D-Shots, Jasmine can perform the  attack.

Umeko
Throughout the series, she spends every moment she can in a bubble bath with her three rubber ducks, Umeyo, Umenosuke, and Umegoro. After eventually learning of Sen-chan's feelings for her, she moves in with him as of the crossover film Mahō Sentai Magiranger vs. Dekaranger and became engaged to him as of succeeding Super Sentai series Uchu Sentai Kyuranger.

Unlike the other Dekarangers, Umeko can use her SP License's Masquerade Mode to instantaneously change her outfit for disguise purposes. In combat, she also wields a D-Knuckle and D-Stick, which she can combine to form the D-Shot and perform the Twin Cam Shot alongside Jasmine.

Tetsu
As a child, Tetsu's parents were killed by an Alienizer named Genio before the former was taken off-world and raised by S.P.D. Due in part to this, he is initially distant with the other Dekarangers, but eventually befriends them.

During the events of the crossover film GoGo Sentai Boukenger vs. Super Sentai, Tetsu, among other veteran Sentai warriors, is recruited by Boukenger member Eiji Takaoka to help him rescue his allies and defeat the Time Demon, Chronos. As of the direct-to-video anniversary special Tokusou Sentai Dekaranger: 10 Years After, Tetsu becomes the new head of S.P.D.'s Earth unit following his predecessor Doggie Kruger being framed for murder and assists in clearing his name.

In combat, Tetsu is practitioner of the fictional fighting style , a martial art that all Tokkyou officers train in to better handle their equipment and battle particularly deadly Alienizers. Unlike the other Dekarangers, he wields the wrist-mounted , which offers the same functions as a SP License, can double as a life support system and fire extinguisher, and allows him to perform a variety of specialized punches.

Deka Machines
The  are giant vehicles that are dispatched from the Deka Base and can combine into mecha.

It can also wield the Judgement Sword to assume its  formation.
: Sen-chan's personal armored semi-trailer truck-themed Deka Machine that carries the Judgement Sword and Signal Cannon into battle.
: Umeko's personal sign car-themed Deka Machine equipped with a large retractable signboard.
: A combat vehicle-themed Deka Machine from S.P.D.'s Planet Leslie branch that Tetsu pilots during the events of the film Tokusou Sentai Dekaranger The Movie: Full Blast Action.
: Five aircraft-themed Deka Machines that Swan designed to work in conjunction with the primary Dekarangers' S.W.A.T. Modes.
: Ban's personal fighter jet-themed Pat Wing with the highest speed and mobility.
: Hoji's personal VTOL aircraft-themed Pat Wing with hovering capabilities, high stability, and wingtip blasters.
: Sen-chan's personal cargo jet-themed Pat Wing with high confidentiality, making it suitable for the conveyance of dangerous goods.
: Jasmine's personal stealth bomber-themed Pat Wing with high stealth and endurance capabilities and equipped with special arms such as flares and tear gas bombs.
: Umeko's personal water bomber-themed Pat Wing equipped with a speaker and fire-extinguishing capabilities.

Deka Base
Deka Base Robo can also perform the  finisher.

Deka Bike
The  is a giant motorcycle piloted by Tetsu that can also transform into , which is equipped with the twin  and can perform the  finisher.

S.P.D. Mecha
: The name given to Dekaranger Robo riding the Deka Bike that can perform the  attack.
This formation appears exclusively in the film Tokusou Sentai Dekaranger The Movie: Full Blast Action.
: The combination of the Pat Wings that is equipped with the twin  handguns and specializes in aerial and zero-g combat.

Recurring characters

S.P.D.
Their Space Prosecution Office headquarters is based on Planet Gowashichoru, which is affected by a form of time dilation called the Sion Morse effect, causing it to move faster than the rest of the universe. When the Dekarangers judge an Alienizer, which takes ten seconds on Earth, an eight-month trial concurrently takes place on Gowashichoru to determine the criminal's innocence or guilt in a particular crime.

Doggie Kruger
While operating as a Dekaranger in his younger years, he earned a legendary reputation as  due in part to his willingness to do anything to save those he cares about. Despite this, he displays feelings for his assistant Swan and panics whenever he hears she has an admirer.

During the events of the direct-to-video anniversary special Tokusou Sentai Dekaranger: 10 Years After, Kruger investigated his superior, Kight Reidlich's, corruption, but was framed for murder and held captive for two years before his team rescues him in the present. Soon after, Kruger admits his feelings for Swan.

Though he is capable of destroying 100 foes without being defeated, he suffers from a backbone problem that causes him to miss once every 2000 attacks until he is cured by Abaranger member and chiropractor, Yukito Sanjyo.
 

Swan Shiratori
 is Doggie Kruger's intellectually and technologically gifted assistant from Planet Cigno who provides the Dekarangers with their arsenal. While she possesses a special "Swan License", which grants her the ability to transform into the orange-colored , she has a personal policy to only do so once every four years excluding emergency situations.

As Deka Swan, she can perform the  attack and the  finisher.

Murphy
 is a "talented robot police dog" that possesses the "latest model ultra-performance... A.I." who is used to track criminals and objects using his enhanced sense of smell. As of the crossover film Mahō Sentai Magiranger vs. Dekaranger, Murphy was transferred to the Fire Squad and upgraded with the ability to transform into Ban's Battlizer Mode.

Other members
: An octopus-like member of S.P.D. and Ban's former instructor from Planet Octo who feels his student should be removed from S.P.D. due to his recklessness. Porupo is voiced .
: The professional avian supreme commander of S.P.D. from Planet Horus.
: An ape-themed member of S.P.D. and old friend of Doggie Kruger's from Planet Torto who owns a mechanical dog named  and trains the Dekarangers to assume their S.W.A.T. Modes.
: The chief of the Tokkyou Division's first squad from Planet Lumiere and Tetsu's mentor who believes that the perfect officer must be passionless to be efficient. Additionally, she can transform into the silver-colored , which also grants her the use of a BraceThrottle. After coming to Earth, she initially intends to take Tetsu back for straying from her teachings, but decides against after seeing him fight and realizing that passion can be a positive trait for an officer.
: Ban's leonine predecessor from Planet Leon who was meant to become Deka Red on Earth, but was badly injured while protecting Jasmine and Hoji from an Alienizer called Terry X, which seemingly forced Rou to retire. In the present, after being forced out of hiding when Terry X resurfaces, Rou recruits Ban in recognition of his fiery passion and drive for crime-fighting.

Alienizers
 is an umbrella term that S.P.D. gives to aliens that commit various crimes on Earth and other planets. Unlike most monsters in the Super Sentai franchise, many of the Alienizers pilot giant robots called , which are usually provided by Agent Abrella.

Agent Abrella
 is a bat-themed arms dealer from Planet Rain and an infamous figure in the intergalactic black market known for causing wars in seven galaxies, destroying billions of lives in the process. As his homeworld's name suggests, it is perpetually raining, forcing him to wear a special helmet that produces an artificial rainy environment to sustain himself on other worlds. After arriving on Earth, he offers his services, such as Mechanoids and Kaijuki, to his fellow Alienizers for the right price. Initially acting in the shadows, Abrella gathers information on the Deka Base from clients who have successfully infiltrated or entered it and escaped with their lives while setting up a plan over time to fulfill his desire for a "world of...currency and crime". After eventually making his presence known to the Dekarangers and losing a Browgoul he intended to raise to them, Abrella starts taking their interference personally and launches a failed smear campaign against them. Following this, Abrella takes advantage of the Dekarangers' fight with the Alienizer Jellyfis to break a quartet of Alienizers out of prison and lead them in taking over the Deka Base. From there, he uses Deka Base Robo to go on a rampage, lure the bulk of S.P.D.'s forces to Earth, and use their planetary forcefield against them. While the Dekarangers eventually retake Deka Base Robo and use the D-Bazooka to delete Abrella, he is succeeded by his pupil, Agent X, as of the crossover film Mahō Sentai Magiranger vs. Dekaranger.

In the direct-to-video anniversary special Tokusou Sentai Dekaranger: 10 Years After, Kight Reidlich cloned a giant version of Abrella that he kept on Planet Highgord to help him fight the Dekarangers. However, Clone Abrella is killed by Dekaranger Robo piloted by Deka Break.

Throughout the series, Abrella pilots the following Kaijuki as part of his schemes:
: A chest-of-drawers-themed Super Kaijuki that he used in his smear campaign against the Dekarangers before it is destroyed by Deka Base Robo.
: Abrella's personal Kaijuki that can assume the  drill vehicle mode. He tasks the Alienizer, Angorl, with using it to attack the Deka Base and damage Dekaranger Robo before the Kaijuki is destroyed by Deka Bike Robo and the Deka Wing Cannon. During the events of Mahō Sentai Magiranger vs. Dekaranger, Agent X pilots the succeeding model, before it is blasted into space by Magi Legend and the Deka Wing Cannon and destroyed by Magi King, Dekaranger Robo, Travelion, and Deka Bike Robo.

Mechanoids
The  are android foot soldiers created by Abrella and used by the Alienizers whom he offers his services to that emerge from grenade-like canisters.

: Gray-colored asteroid-themed androids that wield blasters and swords.
: Blue-colored planet-themed androids that lead the Anaroids and wield hand-mounted guns and later swords. The Batsuroids are voiced by Katsumi Shiono and Yuuki Anai.
: Orange-colored star-themed androids that are able to speak human languages, lead the Anaroids and Batsuroids, and primarily wield swords that allow them to perform the  attack.

Minor Alienizers
: A giant non-humanoid alien from Planet Lovely who smuggled the Fan Crusher's control mechanism for Don Moyaida, who subsequently betrayed him. In a fit of rage, Balance takes a bus and its occupants hostage, but is easily defeated and arrested by Deka Blue, Green, Yellow, and Pink.
: A diamond-themed criminal from Planet Diamante who is charged with infanticide, vehicular manslaughter, and the theft of terrestrial resources. He was originally believed to have died following a car chase with Ban in his combat vehicle-themed Kaijuki, but Don Moyaida resurfaces on Earth disguised as a human to use his primary drill vehicle-like Kaijuki, to harvest the planet's resources and produce space jewelry as well as give Agent Abrella information on the Deka Base's Anubisium, the material used in its walls' construction. Don Moyaida succeeds in the latter task before he is deleted by Deka Red while the Fan Crusher is destroyed by Dekaranger Robo.
: A criminal and underling of Kevakia from Planet Grorser who is charged with kidnapping for profit-making and murder in Star-29. Hell Heaven pilots a lobster/fiddler crab-themed Kaijuki called  in an attempt to kidnap Princess Erika and distract the Dekarangers, but is deleted by Deka Blue while Devil Capture is destroyed by the Pat Striker in its Driving Sword formation.
: A digital-based being from Planet Rikomo who is capable of traveling through the internet and emerging from computers, but is powerless outside of one. He uses Hell Heaven to distract the Dekarangers while he kidnaps Princess Erika and ransom her for her family's Wellness Stone. His physical body is deleted by Deka Red and Blue, but he successfully transfers his data into his personal Kaijuki, and becomes its AI. Nevertheless, it is destroyed by Dekaranger Robo.
: A rhinoceros-themed criminal from Planet Anri who possesses an armored body and is charged with mass-murder on five planets. While working for the scientist Mano Mark, Beildon turns humans into gasoline for a share of his employer's profits and commits bank robberies to help Mark fund his work until the latter is deleted by the Dekarangers via the D-Bazooka.
: A plant-themed criminal from Planet Ridomiha who is charged with murder and planetary invasion and capable of secreting healing liquid from her stalks and high-powered water streams capable of slicing objects. Due to their homeworld changing from a water-based planet to a desert-based one, she and her sister  scouted Earth with the intention of stealing its water. After Karmia developed second thoughts, Kersus killed her and framed an alien named Braidy, but Sen-Chan discovers the truth before the Dekarangers delete Kersus with the D-Bazooka.
: A childish 10,708-year old Cthulhu-themed Alienizer from Planet Cuwartl who is charged with turning people into dolls. He manipulates Hikaru, a lonely boy with the power to teleport objects, into helping him before he is deleted by Dekaranger Robo while piloting the Kaijuki .
After escaping in the present, he seeks out his ex-girlfriend Myra and pilots a ninja-themed Kaijuki called  to stop the Dekarangers, who destroy the Kaijuki with Dekaranger Robo before deleting Sheik with the D-Bazooka.
In the present, he is hired by Ben G and Agent Abrella to assassinate Doggie Kruger and retrieve information on the Deka Base respectively. Vino succeeds in the latter task before he enlarges himself and is deleted by Dekaranger Robo.
: A criminal from Planet Kajimeri who was charged with mass-murder and swore revenge on Doggie Kruger following a near-death experience amidst a chase between them that turned the former into a cyborg. As part of his revenge, Ben G tasks a Batsuroid with piloting a drill-themed Kaijuki called  to distract the Dekarangers while he infiltrates the Deka Base and kidnaps Swan Shiratori. Terrible Terror is destroyed by Dekaranger Robo while Ben G is deleted by Deka Master. During the events of the crossover film Tokusou Sentai Dekaranger vs. Abaranger, Trinoid #0 Saunaginnan resurrects Ben G, who is subsequently killed by Deka Master, Pink, and Break as well as Abare Killer.
: A werewolf/vampire bat-themed criminal from Planet Cristo who is charged with burglary and murdering several S.P.D. officers. As his body is photosensitive, he tasks a Batsuroid with piloting a Kaijuki called  to distract the Dekarangers while Ferley locates and eats a mineral called Lunar Metal so he can roam freely in daylight. Devil Capture 4 is destroyed by Dekaranger Robo while Ferley is deleted by the Dekarangers via the D-Bazooka. In the direct-to-video special Tokusou Sentai Dekaranger Super Video: Super Finisher Match! Deka Red vs. Deka Break, a variation of Ferley called  appears as part of a simulation training session.
: A brutal flame/astronaut-themed criminal and self-proclaimed  from Planet Titarn who seeks out an android girl named Flora, who he created to control his giant creation, . He tasks a Batsuroid with piloting a gladiator-themed Kaijuki called  and attacking the Deka Base while he locates Flora. Metiussl is eventually deleted by Deka Master while Cannon Gladiator is eaten by Gigas, which is subsequently destroyed by Deka Base Robo.
: A kung fu/Drunken Master-themed criminal from Planet Ozchu who is charged with medical violations and homicide, can strengthen himself by drinking alcohol, carries a bottle of Earth sake, and possesses a fighting style tailored to how drunk he is. He poses as a restaurateur named  until he is confronted by Umeko, enlarges himself, and deleted by Dekaranger Robo.
: A criminal from Planet Woojon who possesses the ability to swap bodies with another target and is wanted on seven planets on burglary and vandalism charges. After being captured by S.P.D. while using a Kaijuki called , which was destroyed by Deka Base Robo, he attempts to take over the Deka Base for himself and reveal its secrets to Agent Abrella by switching bodies with Hoji, only to partially succeed in the latter task before he is returned to his original body and deleted by the Dekarangers via the D-Bazooka.
: A tiny planetary bomber and destroyer of worlds from Planet Geurmerl. He plants several bombs on Earth and challenges S.P.D.'s Earth unit to find them as part of a game he played with previous planets before he destroyed them while using his size to hide from them. After Ban finds him disguised as a walkie-talkie, Byz Goa retaliates by piloting a Kaijuki called , only to be deleted by Dekaranger Robo.
: A criminal from Planet Drad who kidnaps Attika Alpachi's son to force him into taking a city block hostage while Goldom robs a nearby bank in the confusion, only for the Dekarangers to realize the truth. Goldom attempts to escape in his Kaijuki, but is deleted by Deka Bike Robo.
: A hermaphroditic spider-themed criminal and stalker from Planet Amore who possesses four tendrils capable of firing spider silk-like threads to restrain targets and whose people earned a reputation for being overly passionate and "too in love". Following a brief encounter with Tetsu while the officer was working undercover as a woman, falling in love with "her", and eventually metamorphosing from his powerless immature form to his stronger adult form, Baachiyo stalks Swan Shiratori under the belief that she was the person he fell in love with. Upon learning it was Tetsu, Baachiyo attempts to force himself on the officer before the Dekarangers arrest the alien.
: A gas-based criminal from Planet Spirit who is capable of possessing other beings. He secretly possesses Ban, but is forced out by Hakutaku. Byoi retaliates by piloting a Cyclops-themed flight-capable Kaijuki called , but is deleted by Deka Bike Robo. Byoi is voiced by Katsumi Shiono.
: A lizard-themed fighter in Durden's illegal fight club from Planet Bees who consumes the illegal steroid Megagesterine and fights Hoji and Tetsu.
: A aerokinetic, Cyclops-themed thief and serial killer from Planet Barige who previously robbed criminals to raise money for orphans before he became reckless. He enlarges himself, but is deleted by Super Dekaranger Robo. During the events of the crossover film Tokusou Sentai Dekaranger vs. Abaranger, Saunaginnan resurrects Milibar, who is subsequently killed by Deka Red, Blue, and Green and Abare Yellow.
: Milibar's bird-themed partner from Planet Wande who helped him rob criminals to raise money for helping orphans before being incarcerated in the Prison Satellite Alcapo.
: A Noppera-bō-themed copycat criminal and fan of Genio's from Planet Pouchie who is capable of copying others' DNA and assuming their forms and powers. He uses the forms of and commits the same or similar crimes as Kevakia, Beildon, Kersus, Dazgonelr, Sheik, and Blitz and rebuilds Blitz's Kaijuki, God Pounder, to gain Genio's attention before Bolapeno is deleted by Dekaranger Robo.
: A jackal-themed hitman from Planet Pukos who is charged with several counts of homicide. He is hired by Princess Io Yonmerluicchi's maid to assassinate the former, but is foiled by the Dekarangers. He retaliates by piloting a Kaijuki called , but is deleted by Super Dekaranger Robo.
: A scatterbrained underling of Don Sanoa's from Planet Bots who adopts Muscle Gear, a powerful exosuit with the ability to turn its wearer invisible and render them invulnerable to most attacks. Zortac is deleted by the primary Dekarangers in their S.W.A.T. Modes.
: A profligate from Planet Thousan who murdered countless innocents via his Kaijuki , which is capable of transforming into a stealth aircraft, in a specialized game he and his friends set up with a rare jewel as a marker. Gineka is deleted by the Deka Wing Cannon.
 and : Gineka's accomplices from Planets Handore and Tente respectively who join him in his game after rebuilding Durden and Dazgonelr's respective Kaijuki, Ultimate Evil and Embarns, before they are deleted by Deka Wing Robo.
: A seahorse-themed criminal from Planet Tenkao who is charged with 103 counts of burglary and murdered Detective Chou San's daughter 13 years prior to the series, though the latter could not originally be connected to him. After he is successfully charged with the murder in the present, Namunan attempts to escape justice in his Kaijuki, only to be deleted by the Deka Wing Cannon.
 and : Namunan's partners of the same species who are killed by Chou San.
: A vine-themed criminal from Planet Mike who is charged with several counts of mass murder and inhuman experimentation stemming from his stealing young women's nutrients to cure his sister Teresa, who is dating Hoji. Despite learning of Clord's goal and being initially torn over allowing him to continue, Hoji ultimately deletes him before he can kill another group of young women.
: A cricket-themed bank robber from Planet Aladon who is charged with burglary and child abduction, having killed Yaako's parents to take advantage of her natural ability to manipulate locks. After requesting Agent Abrella's help to access the Deka Base's systems, Yaako betrays Gyanjava and helps the Dekarangers foil his latest robbery. Gyanjava dons a Muscle Gear to evade capture and judgment before piloting a Kaijuki called  to crush the Dekarangers, only to be thwarted and judged by Deka Bike Robo. While Cannon Gladiator 4 is destroyed by Deka Base Robo, Gyanjava escapes from the Kaijuki, only for Yaako to disable his Muscle Gear before Deka Red S.W.A.T. Mode deletes him. Gyanjava is voiced by Yoshinori Okamoto, who also portrays his human form.
: A spotty-eyed stag beetle-themed criminal from Planet Yuilwer who invades young women's dreams to steal their souls and create a youth potion from them. After targeting Umeko and attempting to use a Kaijuki called  to further her plans, she is deleted by Deka Yellow and Pink in their S.W.A.T. Modes while Megaroria 2 is destroyed by Deka Wing Robo.
: A white tiger-themed member of the Intergalactic Mafia from Planet Guirark and rival to Don Blaco who is attacked and killed by Jingi.
: A cactus-themed member of the Intergalactic Mafia from Planet Zabun and rival to Don Bianco who hires Jingi to kill him, only to be killed by the assassin as well.
: A self-centered assassin from Planet Assassin who possesses a chain on his head capable of sending targets to another dimension and considers his skills far beyond that of typical killers, becoming murderously violent whenever someone questions or insults them. He kills indiscriminately until the Dekarangers confront him. He pilots a Kaijuki called  in retaliation, but is deleted by the Deka Wing Cannon.
: A squid/cactus-themed criminal and breeder of alien monsters called Browgoul from Planet Sumasuleen who is capable of disguising himself as others and is willing to sacrifice countless worlds to ensure his pets' existence. After arriving on Earth, he murdered a professor and fed his corpse to a hatched Browgoul before assuming the deceased's identity to redirect a meteor towards Earth. However, the Dekarangers discover his true identity and delete him via their S.W.A.T. Modes.
Seeking revenge against Kruger for inheriting his father's dojo, Biskes attacks the Dekarangers for their badges on Agent Abrella's behalf as part of the latter's smear campaign against them until Biskes is deleted by Deka Master.
: A jackal-themed con artist from Planet Sukeko who is charged with manipulating, marrying, and killing 273 women via Psycho Mushrooms. Posing as a human named , he targets Umeko. However, a suspicious Sen-chan confronts Mashu, who unwittingly exposes himself while bragging about his intentions before he is deleted by Deka Pink S.W.A.T. Mode.
: A coil-themed criminal from Planet Dynamo who possesses arm-mounted, weaponized coilguns and is charged with absorbing ESPers' life forces and converting them into plasma batteries to sell on the black market, having done so across 445 planets long before S.P.D. was founded and been already approved for deletion. Fifteen years prior, he captured then-rookies Hoji and Jasmine and nearly killed them before the pair's partner Gyoku Rou saved them and seemingly deleted Terry X. Having survived, Terry X resurfaces in the present with upgraded batteries he bought from Agent Abrella to renew his attempt to absorb Jasmine's life force, only to be overpowered by the Dekarangers. He uses his new batteries to enlarge himself, but is deleted by the Deka Wing Cannon.
: A non-humanoid jellyfish-like criminal from Planet Kulern who can take over human beings' nervous systems, which is forbidden by space law. He controls Ban, but Tetsu uses his Super Electro Fist to briefly kill him, forcing Jellyfis off before Tetsu revives Ban with his Electro Fist technique. Jellyfis pilots the Kaijuki, Million Missile, in retaliation, but is deleted by Super Dekaranger Robo, which Agent Abrella takes advantage of to storm the Deka Base.
: An anglerfish-themed criminal from Planet Gimo who Agent Abrella broke out of prison and equipped with a Hyper Muscle Gear to assist him in attacking the Deka Base via his personal Kaijuki, Abtrex, only to be deleted by the Deka Wing Cannon and Deka Bike Robo.
: A sea urchin-themed criminal from Planet Gedo and the inspiration behind the Igaroids who Agent Abrella broke out of prison and equipped with a Hyper Muscle Gear to assist him in attacking the Deka Base, only to be deleted by the Dekarangers. Uniga is voiced by Kazuya Nakai.
: A crab-themed criminal from Planet Drag who Agent Abrella broke out of prison and equipped with a Hyper Muscle Gear to assist him in attacking the Deka Base, only to be deleted by Deka Blue and Green.
: A mantis shrimp-themed criminal from Planet Jergo who Agent Abrella broke out of prison and equipped with a Hyper Muscle Gear to assist him in attacking the Deka Base, only to be deleted by Deka Yellow and Pink.

Special Criminal Alienizers
Special Criminal Alienizers are criminals who have committed high-profile crimes and are pursued by S.P.D.'s Tokkyou division.

: Three alien siblings from Planet Reversia who are wanted on 79 planets on marauding and murder charges and possess a Kaijuki called . Their modus operandi is to have Succubus and Bon-Goblin arrive on an ideal planet first before contacting Blitz. Once they can have their fun with the planet and its inhabitants, they destroy the former and move on to another planet to repeat the process. Upon arriving on Earth however, they are pursued by Deka Break.
: A goblin-themed criminal, the middle child of the Hells Siblings, and the strongest member who possesses an insatiable hunger, poly-matter digestion capabilities, metallic fists, and a muscular body that renders him immune to most bladed weapons, though his throat is his weakest area. After enlarging himself, he is deleted by Deka Bike Robo. During the events of the crossover film Tokusou Sentai Dekaranger vs. Abaranger, Trinoid #0 Saunaginnan resurrects Bon-Goblin, who is subsequently deleted by Aba Red, Abare Blue and Black, and Deka Yellow.
: A human-like namesake-themed criminal and the youngest of the Hells Siblings who is capable of draining the lifeforce of those she touches. She initially attempts to use her powers on Jasmine, but learns of her ESP and tries to make the latter her pet instead. Despite being mortally wounded by Blitz, Succubus dies transferring her lifeforce to him. During the events of the crossover film Tokusou Sentai Dekaranger vs. Abaranger, Saunaginnan revives Succubus, who is subsequently deleted by Deka Pink and Yellow and Abare Yellow.
After being defeated by the Dekarangers, he attempts to escape in God Pounder, only to be deleted by Riding Dekaranger Robo.
: The owner of an illegal fight club, gambling operation, and illegal steroid ring from Planet Tyler. After recognizing the Dekarangers while they were infiltrating his fight club, he retaliates by piloting a demon-themed Kaijuki called , only to be deleted by Super Dekaranger Robo.
: A mirror-themed criminal from Planet Speckion who possesses the ability to travel through and trap people in reflective surfaces, is charged with trapping over 1,000,000 people on 124 planets in his mirror world as his personal "works of art", and murdering Tetsu's parents after they inadvertently surprised him during an attempt to escape S.P.D. on Earth. Two years prior to the series, he was captured by Tetsu and eventually incarcerated in  within solitary confinement and denied access to reflective surfaces. Despite this, Genio would become famous among other Alienizers and inspire criminals to outdo or impress him. In the present, Tetsu questions Genio about a rash of copycat crimes, with the latter revealing the culprit is Bolapeno in exchange for asking Tetsu if he remembered what his mother said at the time of her death to make him cry. Using Tetsu's tear, Genio escapes and returns to Earth to make Tetsu suffer further. However, Tetsu discovers how to free Genio's victims before deleting him. During the events of the crossover film Tokusou Sentai Dekaranger vs. Abaranger, Saunaginnan resurrects Genio, but the latter is deleted by Deka Blue, Green, and Break and Abare Blue.
Sometime prior to the series, he intended to use his Gyutanium Crystal to power a dangerous weapon, but was arrested. After escaping with help from his underling Zortac, Don Sanoa takes Tetsu and Kruger hostage and equips himself with Muscle Gear, but is deleted by the primary Dekarangers in their S.W.A.T. modes.
: A fire-themed serial arsonist from Planet Pyr who is charged with 4,103 counts of arson and three counts of planetary incineration and wears a heater-themed protective suit to move freely on other planets. He initially overpowers the Dekarangers until Deka Break discovers his weakness and defeats him.

Other Alienizers
: Living robots from Planet Algol who appear exclusively in the film Tokusou Sentai Dekaranger The Movie: Full Blast Action. They steal the deadly Golden Snow virus, which transforms organic lifeforms into living robots like themselves, and use it on Planet Leslie in the hopes of selling the vaccine for exorbitant prices, only to be deleted by the Dekarangers.
: A deranged member of the group who is deleted by Deka Blue.
: A female member of the group who is deleted by Deka Yellow and Pink.
: A Gas Drinker who is deleted by Deka Green.
: The leader of the Gas Drinkers and a practitioner of the fictional space martial art . He intimidates Marie Gold into helping him and the Gas Drinkers before turning her into a carrier for the Golden Snow virus when she betrays him. After the Dekarangers delete his fellow Gas Drinkers and being defeated by Deka Red, Volger flees to Planet Leslie to use an army of tank-like Kaijuki called  in an attempt to destroy Earth, only to be deleted by Dekaranger Robo Full Blast Custom.
: A cobra-themed criminal from Planet Ginjifu and a leading member of the  who can disguise himself as any object or person and appears exclusively in the crossover film Tokusou Sentai Dekaranger vs. Abaranger. He attempts to resurrect the Abarangers' enemy Dezumozorlya and use its power to rule the world, only to inadvertently resurrect Abare Killer. After being defeated by the Dekarangers and Abarangers, Kazak retaliates by piloting a Kaijuki called , only to be deleted by Super Dekaranger Robo and Killer AbarenOh.
: A giant piranha-themed Mechanoid from Planet Chigukade who appears exclusively in the crossover film Mahō Sentai Magiranger vs. Dekaranger. He attacks a restaurant that the Magirangers and Umeko were eating in until he is captured by the Dekarangers and killed by his partner Babon.
: Builjeek's partner and underling of Agent X's from Planet Algol who is armed with shoulder-mounted missile pods, an arm-mounted blaster, and a magic circle that allows him to absorb the Dekarangers' energy attacks and appears exclusively in the crossover film Mahō Sentai Magiranger vs. Dekaranger. He assists Agent X in obtaining the Flower of Heaven, but both are eventually deleted by the Magirangers and Dekarangers via the Flower of Heaven's power.

Guest characters
: The princess of a royal intergalactic family from Planet Fragrant. She is kidnapped by Kevakia, who attempts to ransom her for the rare but powerful Wellness Stone, but is rescued by Ban and Hoji, who delete Kevakia.
: An alien from Planet Juuza who Kersus framed for the murder of her sister Karmia and Agent Abrella enlarged to distract the Dekarangers, who discover the truth and arrest Braidy for causing property damage in his enlarged state.
: A young Esper with the ability to teleport inanimate objects. Originally a street wanderer, he hated humans because they mistreated him due to his powers, and wanted to leave the planet as soon as possible. An Alienizer named Dazgonelr uses this to manipulate Hikaru into helping him commit crimes until Jasmine convinces Hikaru to trust her. Following Dazgonelr's deletion, Hikaru leaves Earth to join S.P.D.'s training academy. As of the direct-to-video anniversary special Tokusou Sentai Dekaranger: 10 Years After, he has joined S.P.D.'s Earth unit and married Jasmine, with whom they have a son named Taiga.
: A young woman from Planet Zamuza who was the subject of a stakeout conducted by the Dekarangers due to her ex-boyfriend, an Alienizer named Sheik, having recently escaped from prison. However, Ban becomes enamored by her and goes undercover as her apartment building's plumber to socialize with her. After Sheik attacks Myra and the Dekarangers delete him, Myra loses respect for Ban for lying to her, but chooses to remain friends with him since he kept his promise to protect her.
: A giant alien baby from planet Ocarna who possesses currently uncontrollable size-changing capabilities limited by a special pacifier and shockwave-inducing cries. After Amy's cradle pod lands on Earth, Umeko is assigned to protect her until the former's parents can come and pick her up. Agent Abrella sends an Igaroid to pilot a Kaijuki called  and capture Amy, but Umeko destroys them with Dekaranger Robo before Amy's parents arrive and take their daughter back.
: An android designed to resemble a teenage girl who an Alienizer named Metiussl originally named  and created to serve as the brain of his robotic monster, Gigas. After meeting and befriending Sen-chan however, she learned to develop a "heart" and be more than a machine. After being captured by Metiussl and rescued by Deka Master, Flora joins S.P.D., who accepts her as a human.
: An alien from Planet Zoina who ages more slowly than humans, crashed-landed in Kyoto during Feudal Japan, and became a samurai under Ban's ancestor's tutelage. After ending up in the present, Agent Abrella manipulates the confused Baytonin into believing the Dekarangers are malicious invaders until Ban uses Doggie Kruger's D-Sword Vega to defeat Baytonin in battle. Upon realizing the truth, Baytonin leaves peacefully.
: Ban's ancestor from Feudal Japan who nursed the stranded Baytonin back to health and trained him in the ways of bushido and samurai conduct. Bannoshin Akaza is portrayed by Ryuji Sainei, who also portrays Ban Akaza.
: An alien from Planet Barisie. An Alienizer named Goldom kidnaps his son and forces him to take a city block hostage and threaten to destroy with a bomb so Goldom can rob a nearby bank in the confusion. While negotiating with Alpachi for the hostages' release, Umeko realizes the truth and clears his name while her teammates rescue Alpachi's son and delete Goldom. Attika Alpachi is voiced by Bin Shimada.
: A wise woman from Planet Shinoo with knowledge of all space herbs who occasionally assumes the form of a human teenage girl and possesses a third eye shaped like a red jewel. After the Dekarangers take her into their protective custody, she provides guidance to Sen-chan, develops an attraction towards him, and raises money for their wedding.
: A physically imposing demon-themed alien and champion boxer in Durden's illegal fight club from Planet Bandare. After consuming Durden's steroid, Megagesterine, and gaining wing-like horns on his arms and neck, Jeeva fights Hoji, who defeats him. Following this, Jeeva reformed and found work as the assistant director of a television station.
: A small-time criminal from Planet Slorpe who resembles a ganguro girl and possesses proficient hacking skills. After receiving a missile targeting device disguised as a gem from Agent Abrella, she travels to Earth in the Kaijuki , which is destroyed by Deka Bike Robo while she is captured by S.P.D.'s Earth unit. She escapes to rekindle a former relationship, but is confronted by the Dekarangers and learns of Abrella's true intentions. Once the Dekarangers stop the missile and jettison Faraway to safety, she is pardoned.
: A princess from Planet Tokasa who resembles Umeko. Io Yonmerluicchi is portrayed by Mika Kikuchi, who also portrays Umeko.
: A feline alien child from Planet Chanbenar who tries to steal medicine from Hakutaku for his sick mother after he was unable to buy it with a pearl he found, but is stopped and befriended by Sen-chan. After surviving an attempt on his life by an Alienizer named Gineka, who used the pearl in his Kaijuki game, Gin's mother receives medicine from Hakutaku at Sen-chan's request.
: A retired veteran detective from Planet Teran who seeks revenge on an Alienizer named Raja Namunan for killing his daughter 13 years prior, but was never able to prove it. In the present, Jasmine shows him the errors of his ways while confirming his theory.
: A moon-themed alien from Planet Poppen who previously worked with Swan Shiratori and harbored jealousy towards her after she was chosen for the Police Scientific Criminal Investigation Laboratory over him. After remotely operating and allowing the Kaijuki  to be destroyed while gathering data on the Dekarangers' mecha, he assists Agent Abrella in constructing the composite dinosaur-themed Kaijuki,  using parts from Fan Crusher, Devil Capture 2, Shinobi Shadow, Terrible Terror, God Pounder, and Million Missile and powered with a Hymal Reactor. Remotely operating Frankenzaurus, Hymal temporarily overpowers the Dekarangers until he is confronted by Deka Swan, betrayed by Abrella after he sets Frankensaurus' Hymal Reactor to explode, and forced to shut it down before it does so. After the Dekarangers destroy Frankenzaurus with the Deka Wing Cannon, Hymal attempts to commit suicide, but Swan talks him out of it before Tetsu arrests him.
: A singer, guitarist, and Hoji's girlfriend from Planet Mike who suffers from a terminal disease after working on a dangerous mining planet years prior. While her younger brother Clord worked on a cure, it involved stealing nutrients from other young women. Upon learning of Clord's crimes, a torn Hoji deletes him before breaking up with Teresa.
: A small pig-like alien child from Planet Faluf who is capable of manipulating locks. Due to this, she was kidnapped by an Alienizer named Gyanjava, who killed her parents and forced her to aid him in bank robberies across the galaxy. Amidst his attempt to access the Deka Base's systems, Yaako escaped from him and came to S.P.D. to stop Gyanjava. While under Ban's protection, she transforms into her winged adult form before using her powers to remove Gyanjava's armor so Ban can delete him.
: Hoji's younger sister who also blurts out English phrases when she gets upset.
: Monstrous alien beasts that feed on the metal of meteors to increase in size. An Alienizer named Nikaradar brings two of the beasts to Earth, where he feeds the corpse of a professor he killed and disguised himself as him to direct a meteor to Earth. Though the first Browgoul is killed by Super Dekaranger Robo, its power is transferred to its recently hatched younger sibling, who overpowers Super Dekaranger Robo before willing the meteor back on its course to Earth. With Nikaradar having been deleted, Abrella intends to breed the second Browgoul himself following Earth's destruction. However, the meteor is destroyed by the Pat Wings while the second Browgoul is destroyed by the Deka Wing Cannon, Deka Ranger Robo, Deka Bike Robo, and Deka Base Robo.

Spin-off exclusive characters
While working undercover as a nightclub singer to investigate the Gas Drinkers' attack on Leslie, she encounters and falls in love with Ban.
: The corrupt chief of the Space Police's Galactic District Police Bureau who appears exclusively in the direct-to-video anniversary special Tokusou Sentai Dekaranger: 10 Years After. Two years prior, Doggie Kruger discovered Reidlich had been selling confidential information to the space mafia , but the latter captured him and used his SP License's Mirage Dimension function to pose as Kruger and frame him for killing the Qurlians and their Clementian hostage Amata in cold blood. However, Amata's daughter Carrie witnessed everything and seeks the Dekarangers' help in stopping Reidlich in the present. After the Dekarangers expose him and rescue Kruger, Reidlich sacrifices his underlings, Assam Asimov and Mugi Grafton, to power his Neo Hyper Muscle Gear and overwhelm the Dekarangers, only to be deleted by them and Deka Master.
After failing to kidnap Carrie and being defeated by Deka Blue, Green, Yellow, and Pink, Reidlich forcibly converts Asimov and Grafton into energy to power his Neo Hyper Muscle Gear.
: A girl from Planet Clement, whose inhabitants can enter the bodies of others for concealment. Two years prior, she and her father Amata accidentally stumbled onto Doggie Kruger discovering Kight Reidlich's corruption. After Reidlich killed Amata, Kruger told Carrie to find his team. She went into hiding before eventually coming to Earth in the present. Upon finding the Dekarangers, they escort her to Planet Gowashichoru before confronting Reidlich.

Notes

References

Super Sentai characters
Fictional police officers
Fictional military organizations